The staircase of the Kunsthistorisches Museum in Vienna is equipped with spandrel and intercolumniation paintings by Gustav Klimt, Ernst Klimt and Franz Matsch,  lunette pictures by Hans Makart and a ceiling painting by Mihály Munkácsy.

History 
In the middle of 1881 the committee in charge of building in Vienna commissioned Hans Makart with the overall equipment of the large staircase. However, since Makart died in 1884, only the lunette pictures had been completed by then and could be affixed to the walls of the museum. The committee had to look for other artists for the missing spandrel and intercolumniation paintings. In 1885 Hans Canon was initially entrusted with the ceiling painting, but he also died a few months later. Finally, Mihály Munkácsy was commissioned to paint the ceiling with Apotheosis of the Renaissance, which was completed in the middle of 1890. The Maler-Compagnie, in which the brothers Gustav and Ernst Klimt as well as Franz Matsch had merged, was to carry out the spandrel and intercolumniation pictures. The works were completed in 1891. Concept and naming of the interior came from Albert Ilg.

Ceiling painting: Mihály Munkácsy 
Munkácsy's Apotheosis of the Renaissance seems like a building of the Renaissance with a dome, which is opened to the sky. In a loggia one can see the pope, below Michelangelo, Leonardo da Vinci and Raphael. Tizian gives lessons in painting, and Paolo Veronese stands on a framework. Personalized representations of fame and glory of the arts hover above - Pheme and Glory.

Plan

References

External links 

 Gustav Klimt im Kunsthistorischen Museum. Article by KHM for the special exhibition (Klimt-Bridge) 2012. Visited on December 23, 2013.
 KHM: Brücke bringt Besuchern Klimt näher. Article by Kurier on the occasion of the special exhibition Klimt-Bridge in 2012. Slideshow. Visited on December 23, 2013.
 Munkácsy Mihály: Apotheose der Renaissance. Thesis by Bernadett Doór, University of Vienna, 2013.

Paintings by Gustav Klimt
Painted ceilings
Paintings in the collection of the Kunsthistorisches Museum